FK RFS is a professional Latvian football club based in Riga, Latvia. It competes in the Virslīga, the top flight of Latvian football.

History
RFS were promoted to the Virsliga for 2016 when Skonto FC failed to obtain a license.

In 2018, RFS qualified for the UEFA Europa League qualifiers for the first time. In 2019, the club achieved its first-ever honour, the Latvian Cup.

It wasn't until 2021–22 that RFS won a European two-legged tie, beating Faroese club KÍ Klaksvík. They went on to beat Hungarian side Puskás Akadémia FC before losing to Belgian club Gent. Later that year, RFS won their first Virsliga and would thus compete in the 2022–23 UEFA Champions League qualifying rounds. They lost to HJK Helsinki in the first qualifying round but were given a bye to the third qualifying round of 2022–23 UEFA Europa Conference League. There, they progressed against Maltese champions Hibernians, and in the playoff round, beat Northern Ireland's Linfield on penalties to become only the second Latvian club to reach the group stages of a European competition, after FK Ventspils which qualified for the 2009–10 UEFA Europa League group stage.

European

Notes
 QR: Qualifying round
 GS: Group stage

Honours
Latvian Higher League
Champions: 2021

Latvian Cup
Winners: 2019, 2021

Players

Current squad

Out on loan

References

External links
  Official website

 
Football clubs in Riga
1962 establishments in Latvia
Association football clubs established in 1962